The 2014–15 UD Las Palmas season was UD Las Palmas' ninth season consecutive in second division of the Spanish football league, the Segunda División, and the 65th as a football club. Besides the Segunda División, the club also competed in the 2014–15 Copa del Rey, losing in the round of 32 to La Liga side Celta Vigo.

Players

First-team squad

Youth players

Out on loan

Competitions

Overview

Segunda División

League table

Results summary

Results by round

Matches

Copa del Rey

References

UD Las Palmas seasons
Las Palmas